Sharpe is a surname. Notable people with the name include:

Government
 Alfred Sharpe (1853–1935), British colonial administrator
 Edward M. Sharpe (1887–1975), Associate Justice of the Michigan Supreme Court
 George Sharpe (politician) (c. 1907 – 1985), Canadian politician, mayor of Winnipeg
 George H. Sharpe (1828–1900), American lawyer, soldier, secret service officer, diplomat and politician
 Henry A. Sharpe (1848–1919), Associate Justice of the Alabama Supreme Court
 Horatio Sharpe (1718–1790), British Royal Governor of Maryland
 James Sharpe (Australian politician)
 Larry Sharpe (politician) (born 1968), American business consultant and political activist 
 Merrell Q. Sharpe, American politician
 Montagu Sharpe (1857–1942), English lawyer and antiquarian
 Nelson Sharpe (1858–1935), Associate Justice of the Michigan Supreme Court
 Penny Sharpe, Australian politician
 Peter Sharpe (1777–1842), American politician, Representative from New York
 Robert Sharpe (born 1945), Justice of the Court of Appeal for Ontario
 Roger Sharpe, American author and politician, former member of the North Carolina Senate
 Thomas Sharpe (politician) (1866–1919), Canadian politician, mayor of Winnipeg
 William Sharpe (North Carolina politician) (1742–1818), U.S. lawyer and politician
 William R. Sharpe Jr. (1928–2009), American member of the West Virginia Senate

Sports
 Albert Sharpe (American football) (1877–1966), American athlete and coach
 Bud Sharpe, American baseball player
 David Sharpe (born 1967), British runner
 David Sharpe (American football) (born 1995), American football player
 Dougie Sharpe (1926–1974), Scottish footballer
 Duncan Sharpe (born 1937), Pakistani cricketer
 Gerry Sharpe (1946–2019), English footballer
 Harry Sharpe (cricketer) (1901–1950), English cricketer
 Harry Sharpe (footballer), English footballer
 Jimmy Sharpe, American college football coach
 John Sharpe (cricketer), (1866–1936), English cricketer
 Lee Sharpe, (born 1971), English footballer
 Luis Sharpe, American NFL football player
 Mike Sharpe, American wrestler
 Nathan Sharpe, Australian rugby union player
 Phil Sharpe (cricketer) (1936–2014), English cricketer
 Phil Sharpe (footballer) (born 1968), English footballer
 Ricky Sharpe (American football), American football player
 Shaedon Sharpe (born 2003), Canadian basketball player
 Shannon Sharpe (born 1968), U.S. American football player
 Sterling Sharpe (born 1965), U.S. American football player
 Tony Sharpe, Canadian sprinter
 Wendy Sharpe (footballer) (born 1963), New Zealand football player

Academics
 Alexander Sharpe (1814–1890), English philologist
 Daniel Sharpe (1806–1856), English geologist
 Eric J. Sharpe, Australian scholar of religious studies
 Kevin Sharpe (historian) (1949–2011)
 Richard Sharpe (historian)
 Richard Bowdler Sharpe, (1847–1909), English zoologist
 Robert Sharpe, Canadian lawyer, author, academic, and judge
 Samuel Sharpe (scholar) (1799–1881), Egyptologist and translator of the Bible
 William F. Sharpe, (born 1934), U.S. economist and inventor of the Sharpe ratio

Arts
 Allan Sharpe (1949–2004), Scottish actor, theatre director and playwright
 Albert Sharpe, Irish stage and film actor
 Avery Sharpe, American jazz musician
 Bill Sharpe, British musician
 Craig Sharpe, contestant on Canadian Idol 4
 Don Sharpe (died in 2004), sound editor
 Gerry Sharpe (1929–1968), American photographer
 Lennox Sharpe (born 1963), Trinidad and Tobago steelband composer
 Matthew Sharpe (born 1962), U.S. novelist
 Tom Sharpe, (born 1928), English satirical author of the novel Wilt
 Tyler-Justin Sharpe (born 2002), American rapper and singer known professionally as Lil Tecca
 Wendy Sharpe, (born 1960), Australian artist
 Will Sharpe, Japanese-English actor, writer, and director

Others
 Charles Richard Sharpe, English recipient of the Victoria Cross
 Edmund Sharpe, (1809–1877), English architect and engineer
 Henry Granville Sharpe (1858–1947), Quartermaster General of the U.S. Army 
 John Sharpe (Australian murderer)
 Karen Sharpe (born 1934), American former actress
 Mal Sharpe (born 1936), U.S. radio and TV personality
 Samuel Sharpe, 19th-century Jamaican missionary and revolutionary

Fictional characters
 Chris Sharpe, a character in Degrassi: The Next Generation
 in the American soap opera The Bold and the Beautiful
 Deacon Sharpe
 Macy Alexander Sharpe 
 Miriam Sharpe, in the Marvel Comics universe
 Richard Sharpe (fictional character), central character in the novel and television series Sharpe
 Steven Sharpe III, alias The Gambler, a member of the Golden Age Green Lantern's rogues' gallery. 
 Thomas and Lucille Sharpe, principal characters in Crimson Peak

See also 
 Sharp (surname)
 Shairp
 Scharping
 Scharf, Scharff

English-language surnames
French-language surnames
Surnames of Old English origin